If I Could Just Go Home is the first album by country artist Ed Bruce, released in 1968. The album contains newly recorded songs, with the exception of five tracks that had previously been featured on single releases between 1966 and 1967. The album reached No. 44 on the Billboard Top Country Albums chart.

Track listing

Personnel
Ed Bruce - vocals
 Louis Nunley, Bergen White, Marijohn Wilkin, Dorothy Ann Dillard, Glenn Baxter, Priscilla Hubbard, Mary Greene, William Wright - other vocals
 Wayne Moss, Jerry Reed, Fred Carter Jr., Jack Eubanks - lead guitar
 Ray Edenton, Jerry Shook - rhythm guitar
 Pete Drake - steel guitar
 Henry Strzelecki, Norbert Putnam - bass guitar
 Bobby Dyson - electric bass
 Jerry Carrigan - drums
 Jerry Smith - piano
 John Hartford - banjo
 Charlie McCoy, Onie Wheeler - harmonica
 Harold Cruthirds, Sadao Harada - cello
 Marvin Chantry, Gary Vanosdale - viola
 Brenton Banks, Kazuhide Isomura, Byron Williams - violin

References

Ed Bruce albums
1968 debut albums
Albums produced by Bob Ferguson (music)
RCA Records albums